Gnathoenia albescens is a species of beetle in the family Cerambycidae. It was described by Stephan von Breuning in 1939. It is known from Gabon.

References

Endemic fauna of Gabon
Ceroplesini
Beetles described in 1939